McIlveen is a surname. Notable people with the surname include:

Arthur McIlveen (1886–1979), Australian Salvation Army officer
Bob McIlveen (1919–1996), Australian rules footballer
Charles McIlveen (1919–2007), Canadian physician and politician
Charles A. McIlveen (1910–1972), Canadian politician
David McIlveen, Northern Irish politician
Gilbert McIlveen, founding member of the Society of the United Irishmen
Irish McIlveen (1880–1960), Irish-born American baseball player
Michelle McIlveen, Northern Irish politician